Papineau Township is one of twenty-six townships in Iroquois County, Illinois, USA.  As of the 2010 census, its population was 499 and it contained 204 housing units.

Originally named Weygandt by early Dutch settlers, the township name was changed in 1862 by later French-Canadian settlers to Papineau, after the Québec nationalist hero of the 1830s Louis-Joseph Papineau.

Geography

Cities, towns, villages
 Papineau

Cemeteries
The township contains these four cemeteries: Jones, Oak Ridge, Papineau and Saint Joseph.

Major highways
  Illinois Route 1

Demographics

School districts
 Donovan Community Unit School District 3

Political districts
 Illinois's 15th congressional district
 State House District 79
 State Senate District 40

References
 
 United States Census Bureau 2007 TIGER/Line Shapefiles
 United States National Atlas

External links
 City-Data.com
 Illinois State Archives

Townships in Iroquois County, Illinois
1855 establishments in Illinois
Populated places established in 1855
Townships in Illinois